Mikheyevskaya is a rural locality (a village) in Yavengskoye Rural Settlement, Vozhegodsky District, Vologda Oblast, Russia. The population was 10 as of 2002.

Geography 
Mikheyevskaya is located 23 km north of Vozhega (the district's administrative centre) by road. Fevralsky is the nearest rural locality.

References 

Rural localities in Vozhegodsky District